Jiří Vojtík (born 2 July 1981 in Prague) is a Czech sprinter. He competed at the 2004 and 2008 Olympic games competing in the 200 meters. He failed to win a medal both times.

External links
 Jiří Vojtík - IAAF.org Profile

1981 births
Living people
Czech male sprinters
Athletes (track and field) at the 2004 Summer Olympics
Athletes (track and field) at the 2008 Summer Olympics
Olympic athletes of the Czech Republic
Universiade medalists in athletics (track and field)
Universiade bronze medalists for the Czech Republic
Athletes from Prague